Rosario Gálvez (October 15, 1926 – September 17, 2015) was a Mexican actress. She was married to Luis Aguilar, "El Gallo Giro", one of the icons of the golden age of Mexican cinema, from 1957 until his death in 1997.

Career
Rosario Gálvez became known in the 1950s for acting in several films such as Salón de belleza, Cuando me vaya, and Para siempre. In the 1960s she acted in films such as El correo del norte, La máscara de la muerte, and Los cuatro Juanes. In 1965 she appeared in her first telenovela: El abismo. In the 1970s, Gálvez acted in the films  and Mama Dolores, while also appearing in telenovelas such as Ven conmigo and Doménica Montero.

During the 1980s, she acted in several telenovelas, such as Bodas de odio and Victoria. In the 1990s she acted in the telenovelas Prisionera de amor and Mi pequeña traviesa, and in 1997 returned to film in Reclusorio. Her last performance was in 2000 in an episode of the television series Mujer, Casos de la Vida Real. That same year, Rosario Gálvez wrote a book about her childhood and her marriage to the actor and singer Luis Aguilar, who died in 1997. The inspiration for that book, ¿Cuentas de un rosario?, was the death of her husband, which was very painful for her. Gálvez had already retired from acting for several years. She died from pneumonia in Mexico City at age 88.

Filmography

Films
 Salón de belleza (1951) .... Elvira
 Sentenciado a muerte (1951)
 Amor, qué malo eres! (1953)
 Cuando me vaya (1954)
 El joven Juárez (1954)
 La entrega (1954) .... Friend of Julia
 Maldita ciudad (1954)
 ¿Mujer... o fiera? (1954)
 Los paquetes de Paquita (1955)
  (1955) .... Leonor
 Para siempre (1955) .... Susi
 La culpa de los hombres (1955)
 La Diana cazadora (1957)
 Sabrás que te quiero (1958)
 Ando volando bajo (1959)
 Flor de canela (1959)
 Mi niño, mi caballo y yo (1959)
 El correo del norte (1960)
 La máscara de la muerte (1961)
 Tres tristes tigres (1961)
 La trampa mortal (1962)
 Atrás de las nubes (1962) .... Married woman
 Los cuatro Juanes (1966) .... Sabina
 El comandante Furia (1966)
 La puerta y la mujer del carnicero (1968) .... Party guest (segment "La puerta")
 La marcha de Zacatecas (1969)
  (1970)
 Mama Dolores (1971)
 Reclusorio (1997) .... Judge (segment "Eutanasia o asesinato")

Telenovelas
 El abismo (1965)
 La búsqueda (1966)
 Deborah (1967)
 La tormenta (1967) .... Carmen Serdán
 Pequeñeces (1971) .... Isabel
 El carruaje (1972) .... Rosalía Cano 
 Extraño en su pueblo (1973) .... Irene
 Ven conmigo (1975) .... Laura
 Doménica Montero (1978) .... Angélica
 Vamos juntos (1979) .... Catalina
 Cancionera (1980) .... Amparo
 La búsqueda (1982)
 Bodas de odio (1983) .... Paula de Mendoza
 Cicatrices del alma (1986) .... Pastora
 Yesenia (1987) .... Amparo
 Victoria (1987) .... Sofía Williams y Montero (1987-1988)
 Un rostro en mi pasado (1990) .... Pacita
 Atrapada (1991) .... Tomasa (1991-1992)
 La sonrisa del Diablo (1992) .... Lena San Román
 Tenías que ser tú (1992-1993)
 Prisionera de amor (1994) .... Eugenia
 Bajo un mismo rostro (1995) .... Luciana de Gorostiaga
 Mi pequeña traviesa (1997-1998) .... Sofía

Television series
 Mujer, Casos de la Vida Real (5 episodes, 1997–2000)

Awards

References

External links
 

1926 births
2015 deaths
Deaths from pneumonia in Mexico
Mexican film actresses
Mexican telenovela actresses
20th-century Mexican actresses